Riverside Cemetery may refer to:

United States 

 Riverside Cemetery (Riverside, California), the original name of the Evergreen Cemetery in Riverside, California
 Riverside Cemetery (Denver, Colorado), listed on the National Register of Historic Places (NRHP) in Denver County
 Riverside Cemetery (Waterbury, Connecticut), listed on the NRHP in New Haven County
 Riverside Cemetery (Macon, Georgia), listed on the NRHP in Bibb County
 Riverside Cemetery (Moline, Illinois)
 Riverside Cemetery (Hopkinsville, Kentucky), home of Edgar Cayce's grave site
 Riverside Cemetery (Lewiston, Maine)
 Riverside Cemetery (Fort Fairfield, Maine)
 Riverside Cemetery (Yarmouth, Maine)
 Riverside Cemetery (Fairhaven, Massachusetts)
 Riverside Cemetery (Saddle Brook, New Jersey)
 Riverside Cemetery (Toms River, New Jersey)
 Riverside Cemetery (Apalachin, New York), listed on the NRHP in Tioga County
 Riverside Cemetery (Endicott, New York), listed on the NRHP in Broome County
 Riverside Cemetery (Lowman, New York), listed on the NRHP in Chemung County
 Riverside Cemetery (Long Eddy, New York), listed on the NRHP in Sullivan County
 Riverside Cemetery (Oswego, New York), listed on the NRHP in Oswego County
 Riverside Cemetery (Rochester, New York)
 Riverside Cemetery (Asheville, North Carolina)
 Riverside Cemetery (West Norriton Township, Pennsylvania), near Norristown, Pennsylvania
 Riverside Cemetery (Pawtucket, Rhode Island), listed on the NRHP in Providence County
 Riverside Cemetery (Jackson, Tennessee), listed on the NRHP in Madison County
 Riverside Cemetery (Oshkosh, Wisconsin), listed on the NRHP in Winnebago County
 Riverside Cemetery (Withee, Wisconsin)

Canada
 Riverside Cemetery (Toronto) - part of Park Lawn Cemetery group

See also
 Riverside Cemetery Chapel, Cleveland, Ohio, listed on the NRHP in Cuyahoga County
 Riverside Cemetery Gatehouse, Cleveland, Ohio, listed on the NRHP in Cuyahoga County